Cyclopedia, cyclopaedia or cyclopedien is an archaic term for encyclopedia.

The term may specifically refer to:

Cyclopædia, or an Universal Dictionary of Arts and Sciences, 1728, edited by Ephraim Chambers 
Rees's Cyclopædia, 1802–20, edited by Abraham Rees
Penny Cyclopaedia,  edited by George Long, published from 1833 to 1843
Tomlinson's Cyclopaedia of Useful Arts, 1852–54, edited by Charles Tomlinson
New American Cyclopaedia, 1857–63, editors George Ripley and Charles A. Dana
The English Cyclopaedia, 1866, edited by Charles Knight
 American Cyclopaedia, 1873–76, the successor to the New American Cyclopaedia, the primary editors were George Ripley and Charles A. Dana
 Cyclopedia of Universal History, 1880–84, World History
 Cyclopaedia of Political Science, Political Economy, and the Political History of the United States, 1881, edited by John Joseph Lalor
Johnson's New Universal Cyclopaedia, 1876, edited by Frederick Barnard and Arnold Guyot
Johnson's Universal Cyclopaedia, 1893, edited by Charles Kendall Adams
Pears Cyclopaedia, a one volume encyclopaedia originally published in the United Kingdom by Pears Soap as Pears Shilling Cyclopaedia in December 1897
Taber's Cyclopedic Medical Dictionary
Universal Cyclopaedia, 1900, edited by Charles Kendall Adams
Universal Cyclopaedia and Atlas, 1902, edited by Rossiter Johnson
The Baseball Cyclopedia, 1922, by Ernest J. Lanigan

Modern use

The Dungeons & Dragons Rules Cyclopedia

See also
List of historical encyclopedias, for a number of less notable Cyclopediae